Green Harvest (French:La verte moisson) is a 1959 French war drama film directed by François Villiers and starring Pierre Dux, Dany Saval and Jacques Perrin.

Plot
In occupied France during the Second World War, a group of school students begin to take action against the German forces.

Cast
 Pierre Dux as L'aumônier du lycée  
 Dany Saval as Dany  
 Jacques Perrin as Jean-Louis Mesnier  
 Francis Lemonnier as Olivier Guerbois  
 Claude Brasseur as Robert Borelli 
 Philippe Adrien as Le fumeur  
 Jacques Gencel as Rouquier  
 Jacques Higelin as Mercadier  
 Jacques Cousin as Duval  
 Gérard Dauzat as Schneider  
 Jean-Pierre Ely as Bory  
 Philippe Féron as Laplanche  
 Robert Kimmich as Gaubert 
 Marie-France Boyer as Sophie  
 René Blancard as M. Borelli  
 Hélène Tossy as Mme Borelli  
 Camille Fournier as Mme Guerbois 
 Jeanne Pérez as Mlle Froment
 François Chaumette as German chaplain
 Jean-Marie Serreau
 René Berthier 
 Jacques Monod
 Reinhard Kolldehoff

References

Bibliography 
 Philippe Rège. Encyclopedia of French Film Directors, Volume 1. Scarecrow Press, 2009.

External links 
 

1959 films
French war drama films
1950s war drama films
1950s French-language films
Films directed by François Villiers
Films set in France
French World War II films
1959 drama films
1950s French films